Makanda is a village in Jackson County, Illinois, United States. As of the 2020 United States Census, the population was 547, down from 561 in 2010. In the early 20th Century it used the slogan "Star of Egypt."

Makanda is part of the Carbondale, IL Micropolitan Statistical Area.

History
The village was named after Makanda, a local Native American chieftain.

After Lincoln’s inauguration,  Theodore and Al Thompson flew the Union flag from a tree atop a hill between Makanda and Cobden in defiance of the Knights of the Golden Circle, a secessionist group that operated throughout the Midwest.  

In 2019, citizens of Makanda rallied against the Illinois Central Railroad Company after an announcement of a tower set to be built in the downtown area and a registered flood plain.

After former U.S. Senator Paul Simon died in 2003, Makanda added a "bow tie" to the smiley face water tower to honor Simon.

Geography
Makanda is located at  (37.618190, -89.229545).

Demographics

As of the 2010 census, there were 561 people, 230 households, and 160 families residing in the village. The racial makeup of the village was 87.5% White, 3.6% African American, 6.6% Asian, and 2.0% from two or more races. Hispanic or Latino of any race were 2.7% of the population.

Of the 230 households in the village, 28.7% had children under the age of 18. Of the 160 family households, 54.8% were married couples living together, 6.5% had a male householder with no wife present, and 8.3% had a female householder with no husband present. 23.0% of all households were made up of individuals, and 5.2% had someone living alone who was 65 years of age or older.  The average household size was 2.44 and the average family size was 2.86.

In the village, the population was spread out, with 23.0% under the age of 20, 14.3% from 20 to 34, 20.9% from 35 to 49, 29.9% from 50 to 64, and 11.9% who were 65 years of age or older.  The median age was 44.4 years. For every 100 females, there were 113.3 males.  For every 100 females age 18 and over, there were 109.4 males.

2005-2009 American Community Survey data indicates the median income for a household in the village was $54,107, and the median income for a family was $72,222. Male full-time workers had a median income of $36,875 versus $43,594 for female full-time workers. The per capita income for the village was $31,898.  5.8% of families and 5.1% of the population were below the poverty line, including 9.8% of those under age 18.

Arts and culture
 Makanda Spring Fest, an annual two-day event featuring local artists and live music.
 Makanda Vulture Fest, an annual two-day event held during the third weekend in October that celebrates the migration of the black vulture and turkey vulture to the region.
 Total solar eclipses: The center lines of the paths of the solar eclipse of August 21, 2017, and the solar eclipse of April 8, 2024 crossed over Makanda. Tens of thousands of spectators were expected to flock to Makanda and surroundings to witness the 2017 eclipse.

Notable people 

 Wayman Presley, Rural mail carrier and founder of the Bald Knob Cross
 Jeanne Hurley Simon, Illinois state legislator
 Paul Simon, U.S. Senator and 1988 Democratic presidential candidate
 Sheila Simon, 46th Lieutenant Governor

References

External links
Village of Makanda: History, Tourism, etc.
Makanda Inn website
Makanda Trading Company

Villages in Jackson County, Illinois
Villages in Illinois